Necropolitan Press, founded in 1993 by editor and author Jeffrey Thomas, is an independent publisher in the genres of horror, science-fiction, dark fantasy, and "the Unclassifiable." Necropolitan Press ceased producing new releases in 2001.

In March 2008, it was announced that Necropolitan Press would be resuming a publication schedule, beginning with Paul G. Tremblay's The Harlequin & The Train novella.

History
Jeffrey Thomas founded Necropolitan Press in 1993 in reaction to his discovery of the then-flourishing small press, causing him to become so enthused with the idea that he "developed the desire to produce some publication or other" of his own. Thomas chose the name for his publishing imprint due to the sound of it—fond of the similarity to the word Metropolitan but with a horrific bent. At the time, Thomas worked as a paste up artist in a print shop, allowing him to create the Necropolitan Press releases during his breaks by using a "light table to paste up the pages the old fashioned way, with an exacto knife and wax."

The initial publication from Necropolitan Press was The End magazine, which ran for four issues under the imprint with a fifth issue being released as a co-production with artist Jon C. Gernon's Zero Publishing. Throughout its run, this fiction anthology zine received newsstand distribution in addition to catalog sales, the internet—at the time—not being a viable distribution alternative. In 1995, Thomas would begin releasing single author and anthology chapbooks, starting with his own collection The Bones of the Old Ones and Other Lovecraftian Tales and averaging one non-magazine release per year. Necropolitan Press releases maintained low print runs; Jeff VanderMeer's The Hoegbotton Guide to the Early History of Ambergris, by Duncan Shriek, for instance, was produced in a 300-copy edition.

Necropolitan Press ceased producing new releases in 2001, the reasons being the press's financial drain on Thomas and the desire of Thomas to focus on his own work. Thomas would later lament this decision, stating that he "always had a great enthusiasm for publishing, [and that he] found it extremely rewarding to bring the work of other authors to the hands of readers eager for something a little out of the ordinary."

In December 2007, Thomas mentioned in an interview that Necropolitan Press may be resurrected with the help of Nick Curtis, whose involvement would alleviate the previous financial and time-related strains the venture placed on Thomas. Curtis was an enthusiast of Thomas's work who had created and maintained an official website for Thomas (including a blog and forum), all of which had revealed to Thomas "his [Curtis's] innovative approach to graphic design." According to Thomas, Curtis proposed the resurrection of Necropolitan Press. Officially, Thomas holds the position of "Publisher/Editorial Director" while Curtis is termed the "Assistant Publisher/Design Director".

Leading up to the resurrection, Thomas had "been talking to some very talented authors in regard to potential new projects." In March 2008, prior to the official announcement of the publishing imprint's return, Paul G. Tremblay mentioned that his forthcoming novella The Harlequin & The Train would be released on Necropolitan Press. In April 2008, Thomas made the official announcement of the press's return and of the forthcoming novella.

Magazines published
The first project published by Necropolitan Press was The End magazine, which ran five issues at the rate of one a year starting in 1993.  The fifth and final issue was produced in cooperation with New York–based artist Jon C. Gernon's Zero Publishing imprint, the Necropolitan Press designation used to denote editor Jeffrey Thomas's work on the title.

Works published

2008+

The following is a list of all the Necropolitan Press anthology and single author collection titles announced/printed since the relaunch of the imprint in 2008.

1995–2001
The following is a list of all the Necropolitan Press anthology and single author collection titles printed during the initial years of the company. One additional title was announced, The Terrible Woman and Other Erotic Horrors by Scott Thomas, but this was withdrawn from the publishing schedule on May 5, 2001—the intended contents were later released in Nether: Improper Bedtime Stories as well as Shadows Of Flesh, both released by Delirium Books in 2004.

References 

 

American speculative fiction publishers
Book publishing companies based in Massachusetts
Book publishing companies based in New York (state)
Companies based in Westborough, Massachusetts
Fantasy book publishers
Horror book publishing companies
Publishing companies established in 1993
Science fiction publishers
Small press publishing companies